Ricardo Parrondo Gómez (born 25 February 1994), known professionally as Ricardo Gómez, is a Spanish television, film and stage actor. His early success as an actor is intrinsic to his 17-year long performance playing the character of Carlitos Alcántara in the TV series Cuéntame cómo pasó, between 2001 and 2018.

Biography 
Ricardo Gómez was born in Madrid on 25 February 1994; his family originally lived in Santiago de Compostela, Galicia, before moving to the Spanish capital.

He joined the cast of the TV series Cuéntame cómo pasó (aired on La 1 since 2001) for the role of Carlos "Carlitos" Alcántara, the younger sibling of the Alcántara family. He was 7 years old when he first performed the character.

During the time he belonged to the cast of Cuéntame, Gómez also performed in other mediums, including his role in José Luis Garci's Tiovivo c. 1950 (2004), short films and stage plays. His breakout performance in a feature film came with 1898. Los últimos de Filipinas (1898, Our Last Men in the Philippines), a 2016 historical war drama film based on the Siege of Baler. He played José, one of the besieged Spanish soldiers garrisoned in the Church of Baler. His performance earned him a nomination for the Goya Award for Best New Actor.

Gómez decided to leave Cuéntame in 2018, after 17 years, 348 episodes and 19 seasons.

Following his exit from Cuéntame, Gómez took part in different theatrical plays such as Mammon (which earned him the Fotograma de Plata Award award for Best Stage Actor) and Rojo, and starred in the series Vivir sin permiso (Unauthorized Living), where he plays Alejandro, a gay teacher and politician.

He also joined the cast of three feature films, El sustituto, Mía y Moi and Donde caben dos, a comedy. El sustituto is a story set in 1982 Spain, in which Gómez plays a police inspector destined to a coastal town where people has normalised the presence of hidden Nazis (a plot inspired by the actual stories of Nazi colonies in the Costa Blanca). Mía y Moi, in which Gómez co-stars with Bruna Cusí, is the story about two siblings who have suffered domestic abuse reuniting in the rural family house after the death of their mother. As of December 2020, amid the COVID-19 pandemic, the filming of the three films was completed and they were expected to be released in the future, tentatively in 2021. In 2021, he starred in the Spanish on-stage adaptation of The Pillowman (El hombre almohada) as Michal.

Filmography

Accolades

References 

1994 births
Living people
21st-century Spanish male actors
Spanish male television actors
Spanish male film actors
Spanish male stage actors
Spanish male child actors
Male actors from Madrid